Christopher John Nicholl (born 12 October 1946) is an English-born former Northern Ireland international footballer who later worked as a coach and manager.

Playing career

Nicholl was born in Macclesfield. He played for Burnley (1963–1966) (no league appearances), Witton Albion, Halifax Town (1968–1969) (42 league appearances, 3 goals) and Luton Town (1969–1972) (97 league appearances, 6 goals), before establishing himself as a centre-half with Aston Villa (1972–1977) (210 league appearances, 11 goals). He captained the side to victory over Everton in the 1976/1977 League Cup after two final replays. The second replay is remembered for Nicholl scoring one of the greatest goals in any Aston Villa match, a forty-yard left footer which helped take the match to extra time.

In a Division One game against Leicester City in 1976, he scored all four goals (two of them own goals) in a 2–2 draw. This was the second time that this feat had been achieved in the top tier English football and followed Sam Wynne's record during a 1923 fixture between Oldham Athletic and Manchester United.

He signed for Southampton in June 1977 and became the backbone of a successful side. He scored eight goals in 228 league appearances, before joining Grimsby Town in August 1983, for whom he made 70 league appearances in three years.

He won 51 Northern Ireland full international caps.

Management

Southampton
After serving Grimsby Town as assistant manager, he returned to Southampton as the club's manager when Lawrie McMenemy resigned in June 1985. He kept the Saints in the First Division but despite having players of the calibre of Danny and Rod Wallace, Alan Shearer and Matthew Le Tissier in his squad, he tended to be too cautious. During his 6 seasons in charge, Saints were under-achievers and his best result was in 1989–90 with a finish in 7th place achieved largely thanks to 20 goals from Le Tissier and 18 from Rod Wallace, although they did reach the FA Cup semi-finals in 1986 and the same stage of the League Cup a year later. This was relatively good for a club of Southampton's size, and under Nicholl they finished higher in the league than a number of bigger clubs including Manchester United, Manchester City, Newcastle United and Chelsea, but under McMenemy they had won the FA Cup in 1976, finished league runners-up in 1984 and then fifth in his final season.

In 1991, the Saints finished in 14th place and Nicholl was sacked in favour of Ian Branfoot. Thus ended a period of managerial stability, with only 3 managers in 36 years and started Southampton's managerial merry-go-round which saw them appoint 12 managers over the next 15 years, and at one stage started three successive seasons with a new manager in charge, although they did hold on to their top flight status until 2005.

Nicholl was responsible for bringing some of the club's most successful players into the first team. These included: Matthew Le Tissier, one of the most prolific strikers in the English league during the 1990s; Alan Shearer, sold to Blackburn Rovers for a British record fee in 1992 and then to Newcastle United for a world record fee in 1996, as well as scoring 30 goals for England; Rod Wallace, who helped Leeds United win the league title a year after leaving Southampton in 1991, and later won several Scottish trophies with Rangers. He also signed teenage goalkeeper Tim Flowers from Wolves in 1986, and seven years later he became Britain's most expensive goalkeeper when he was sold to Blackburn Rovers, helping them win the league title in 1995.

Walsall
It was three years before Nicholl returned to football. Early in the 1994–95 season he replaced Kenny Hibbitt as manager of Walsall FC and his first season at the club was successful as they were promoted from Division Three as runners-up. The Saddlers finished in the top half of Division Two during the next two seasons but Nicholl quit in May 1997 after failing to get Walsall into Division One, citing family reasons.

He made a brief return to Walsall as then-manager Ray Graydon's assistant in November 2001, but left in January 2002 through loyalty to Graydon, who had been sacked. He is now a regular at the Bescot Stadium, both as a supporter and as the correspondent for PA Sport.

Following the sacking of former Walsall player-manager Paul Merson in February 2006, Nicholl offered his services to the club within hours of Merson's departure. Nicholl remains popular amongst Walsall fans, but was not offered the manager's job – which later went to former Birmingham City captain Kevan Broadhurst.

Northern Ireland
In 1998, he was invited to work alongside Lawrie McMenemy as assistant manager of Northern Ireland where he spent the next two years.

Managerial statistics

As of 7 March 2015

Aston Villa Old Stars 
Chris is currently the manager of Aston Villa Old Stars, who regularly play in testimonial and charity matches. The squad includes former Villa stars such as Gordon Cowans, Tony Morley and Des Bremner.

International goals 
Scores and results list Northern Ireland's goal tally first.

Honours
Halifax Town
Fourth Division Runners up: 1969

Aston Villa
League Cup Winners: 1975, 1977
Third Division Champions: 1972

Southampton
League Cup Runners up: 1979

Walsall

Football League Third Division Runners Up: 1994

References

External links
 
 Northern Ireland profile

1946 births
Living people
Sportspeople from Macclesfield
English footballers
English football managers
Northern Ireland international footballers
Association footballers from Northern Ireland
Aston Villa F.C. players
Burnley F.C. players
Grimsby Town F.C. players
Halifax Town A.F.C. players
Luton Town F.C. players
Southampton F.C. players
1982 FIFA World Cup players
Witton Albion F.C. players
English Football League players
Football managers from Northern Ireland
Southampton F.C. managers
Walsall F.C. managers
English Football League managers
Association football central defenders
Grimsby Town F.C. non-playing staff